Suchon Sa-nguandee (born March 10, 1982) or formerly Chalakorn Sa-nguandee, simply known as Chon, is a Thai professional footballer who plays as a left back for Thai League 3 club Kasem Bundit University.

Honours

International 
Thailand U-23
 Sea Games  Gold Medal (1); 2005

External links
 Suchon Sa-nguandee profile at Port website
 

1982 births
Living people
Suchon Sa-nguandee
Suchon Sa-nguandee
Association football wingers
Suchon Sa-nguandee
Suchon Sa-nguandee
Suchon Sa-nguandee
Suchon Sa-nguandee
Suchon Sa-nguandee
Suchon Sa-nguandee
Suchon Sa-nguandee
Southeast Asian Games medalists in football
Competitors at the 2005 Southeast Asian Games